Robert P. "Bert" Wilson was an American college football player and coach.  He played football for Wesleyan University and was captain of the school's football team in 1896.  After graduating, he served as Wesleyan's first head football coach from 1898 to 1902.  In five years as Wesleyan's coach, Wilson compiled a record of 25–21–2.  In his first two years as the coach, Wesleyan compiled records of 7–3 and 7–2.  In the 17 years before Wilson took over as the coach, Wesleyan's football team had never won seven games in a single season.  In 1903, Wilson became the head football coach at New York University (NYU).  He served the sixth head football coach at NYU and held that position for one season, in 1903, leading the NYU Violets to a record of 2–5.

Head coaching record

References

Year of birth missing
Year of death missing
19th-century players of American football
NYU Violets football coaches
Wesleyan Cardinals football coaches
Wesleyan Cardinals football players